Mir Jumla may refer to:

 Mir Jumla I or Mir Muhammad Amin of Shahristan (died 1637 CE), builder of Hajiganj Fort
 Mir Jumla II or Mir Muhammad Saeed of Ardestan (died 1663 CE) (during the reign of Aurangzeb)
 Mir Jumla III or Ubaidullah, son of Mir Muhammad Wafa of Samarkand (died 1731 CE), aide of Farrukhsiyar